Chulym is a town and the administrative center of Chulymsky District in Novosibirsk Oblast, Russia, located on the Chulym River  from Novosibirsk, the administrative center of the oblast. Population:  It was previously known as Chulymskoye.

History
The settlement of Chulymskoye was founded in 1762 during the construction of the Siberian Route. In 1898, the Trans-Siberian Railway was built through the settlement. In 1947, Chulym was granted town status.

Administrative and municipal status
Within the framework of administrative divisions, Chulym serves as the administrative center of Chulymsky District. As an administrative division, it is incorporated within Chulymsky District as the Town of Chulym. As a municipal division, the Town of Chulym is incorporated within Chulymsky Municipal District as Chulym Urban Settlement.

References

Notes

Sources

External links
Official website of Chulym 
Chulym Business Directory 

Cities and towns in Novosibirsk Oblast
Tomsk Governorate